Bishop McNamara High School (BMHS or McNamara) is a private, Catholic coed high school in Forestville CDP in unincorporated Prince George's County, Maryland.

The school is in the Holy Cross tradition offering a college preparatory curriculum and a range of Fine Arts, athletics and activities. Founded in 1964 by the Congregation of Holy Cross, Bishop McNamara is located on a 14-acre campus in Forestville, Maryland, United States, just 7 miles south of Washington, D.C., serving students ranging from six different Maryland counties, Northern Virginia and the District of Columbia and is part of the Roman Catholic Archdiocese of Washington.  The school bears the name of Bishop John Michael McNamara, a former auxiliary bishop to the Archbishops of Baltimore and Washington and the founder of St. Gabriel's parish in Washington, D.C.

History
Built on a site adjacent to Mount Calvary Catholic Church on Marlboro Pike in Forestville, Maryland, Bishop McNamara High School is a result of Msgr. Peter Paul Rakowski's plan to build a Catholic high school for boys, and one for girls in the southern part of Prince George's County. To that end, in 1962, Patrick A. O'Boyle, archbishop of Washington, D.C., extended an invitation to the Brothers of Holy Cross to administer and staff the new high school, which would serve the county and parts of Washington, DC.

Bishop McNamara High School admitted its first classes (freshman and sophomore) of 334 boys in 1964.

In 1992 La Reine High School, an all girls' school in Suitland which opened in 1960, closed in 1992, with its students going to the previously all boys McNamara.

Academics
Bishop McNamara High School provides a Catholic, college-preparatory education.

Bishop McNamara High School provides a variety of courses to help students meet the requirements for college admission or other types of professional preparation. The school boasts a 100% college acceptance rate for the Class of 2016 and Class of 2016 graduates received over $14.4 million in scholarships to colleges and universities all over the country.

Beyond the core academic courses, Bishop McNamara offers:

 Honors courses offered in English, Mathematics, Science, Foreign Language, Information Technology, Social Studies, and each of the fine arts disciplines.
 Advanced Placement courses offered in English Language, English Literature, Calculus, Statistics, Computer Programming, Psychology, Chemistry, Biology, Physics, French, Spanish, U.S. History and European History, Music Theory, Latin Vergil, Latin Poetry, and foreign language literature when there is sufficient student interest.
 Dual credit course offered jointly with Prince George's Community College and open to juniors and seniors whose general academic profile meets Prince George's Community College admissions criteria.
 Online courses, in subjects like Honors Chinese, German, Japanese, and Latin, which complement traditional high school curricula.

Fine Arts
The Fine Arts Department at Bishop McNamara offers one of the arts educations in the Washington, D.C.. The F.A.D.E. program, Fine Arts Diploma Endorsement, is unique to Bishop McNamara. With band, orchestra, choir, theatre, dance and visual arts course offerings, Bishop McNamara High School's Fine Arts Department provides opportunities for student participation.

The Fine Arts Programs include:
 Dance - Ballet, Jazz, Lyrical Jazz, and Tap ranging from Beginning to Advanced levels; Traditional African Dance & Music I through IV, and the Sankofa Company (performing African Dance & Music company).
 Music - (Band & Orchestra and Choir) Band & Orchestra: Concert Band, Symphonic Band, Wind Ensemble, String Orchestra, Jazz Lab, Jazz Ensemble, Percussion Ensemble, and Music Theory; Choir: Concert Choir, Honors Chamber Choir, Honors Madrigal Choir, Vocal Jazz Ensemble, and Show Choir
 Theater - Introduction To Theatre, Acting, Theatre Technology I & II, Great Stages Of Drama, Senior Seminar, Musical Theatre Production (Fall), Spring Theatre Production
 Visual Arts - Color, Drawing & Advanced Drawing, Graphic Design, Digital Photography I & II, and AP Studio Art 2D-Photography
 FADE Program - Students who graduate with the Fine Arts Diploma Endorsement receive a notation on their transcripts and a special honor certificate at graduation. Students have the opportunity to apply for this program at the end of their freshman year, concurrent with the selection of courses for their sophomore year. Students are then given a list of courses, tasks and events to complete in the fine arts by their senior year.

Athletics
Bishop McNamara competes in the Washington Catholic Athletic Conference at the Varsity and Junior Varsity levels in the following sports:

Fall - Football, Women's Tennis, Volleyball, Cross Country, Women's Soccer, Men's Soccer, and Cheerleading
Winter - Men's Basketball, Women's Basketball, Swimming, Wrestling, Cheerleading, and Indoor Track
Spring - Baseball, Softball, Men's Tennis, Men's Lacrosse, Women's Lacrosse, Track & Field, and Golf

Each year student-athletes are selected to the WCAC All-Conference teams, Washington Post All-Met Teams, Maryland All-State Teams, MSABC All State Team, as well as other national, state and conference awards.

In 2013, thirteen student-athletes signed with Division 1 colleges and universities, such as the University of Maryland College Park, Georgia Tech, Fordham University, VCU, UMBC, Sienna College, University of Toledo, Columbia University, University of Tennessee, and George Mason University.

Bishop McNamara's women's basketball team has established itself as one of the premier teams in not only the Washington Catholic Athletic Conference (WCAC) but the entire nation as well. In 2005, the team was ranked #1 by USA Today, and the team finished with only one loss in the WCAC semifinals. In the 2008 season, the Lady Mustangs became WCAC champions.

Notable alumni

Waine Bacon – NFL defensive back (2004–2005)
Todd Bozeman – NCAA basketball coach
Cameron Chism, CFL player
Brandon Coleman - NFL wide receiver for the New Orleans Saints 
Chris Cosh – NCAA football defensive coordinator
Jerome Couplin III – NFL player
Timothy Creamer – NASA astronaut
Marlisa Goldsmith - Emmy award winner (2017)
Matthew Goldsmith - CFL player AFL player 
Tyoka Jackson – NFL player
Jeff Kinney – writer of Diary of a Wimpy Kid
Ty Lawson - basketball player
Jason Reynolds - National Book Award finalist  
Marcus Thornton – basketball player
Keith Veney – NCAA Division I men's basketball record holder for three-pointers made in a single game with 15
Nicole Yeargin – Olympian and NCAA Division I sprinter

References

External links

 Bishop McNamara High School

Catholic secondary schools in Maryland
Schools in Prince George's County, Maryland
Holy Cross secondary schools
Educational institutions established in 1964
1964 establishments in Maryland